Below is a list of squads used in the 1963 Arab Cup.

Jordan
Coach: Shehadeh Mousa

Kuwait
Coach:  Ljubiša Broćić

Lebanon
Coach: Joseph Nalbandian

Syria
Coach:  Miklós Vadas

Tunisia
Coach:  André Gérard

References

External links
Details - rsssf.com

Squad
1963